The Monroe Congregational Church and New Hope Cemetery is a church and cemetery near Monroe, Nebraska.  It was added to the National Register in 1990.  The listing included three contributing buildings and a contributing site.

The Monroe Congregational Church, built in 1881, is one-story frame building with a gable roof. The property includes a privy (c.1881), a storage shed (c.1881), and a Victorian wrought-iron fence.

It is located in the community of O'Kay, which had population 250 around 1990.

References

Congregational churches in Nebraska
Churches on the National Register of Historic Places in Nebraska
Churches completed in 1881
Buildings and structures in Platte County, Nebraska
Historic districts on the National Register of Historic Places in Nebraska
National Register of Historic Places in Platte County, Nebraska
1881 establishments in Nebraska